George Park (19 May 1933 – 26 May 2019) was a Canadian butterfly and freestyle swimmer. He competed in two events at the 1956 Summer Olympics.

References

External links

1933 births
2019 deaths
Canadian male butterfly swimmers
Canadian male freestyle swimmers
Swimmers from Ontario
Sportspeople from Hamilton, Ontario
Olympic swimmers of Canada
Swimmers at the 1956 Summer Olympics
Swimmers at the 1954 British Empire and Commonwealth Games
Swimmers at the 1958 British Empire and Commonwealth Games
Commonwealth Games medallists in swimming
Commonwealth Games silver medallists for Canada
Swimmers at the 1955 Pan American Games
Pan American Games silver medalists for Canada
Pan American Games bronze medalists for Canada
Pan American Games medalists in swimming
Medalists at the 1955 Pan American Games
Medallists at the 1954 British Empire and Commonwealth Games
Medallists at the 1958 British Empire and Commonwealth Games